Law Lai Wah (born 22 August 1967) is a Hong Kong judoka. She competed in the women's lightweight event at the 1992 Summer Olympics.

References

External links
 

1967 births
Living people
Hong Kong female judoka
Olympic judoka of Hong Kong
Judoka at the 1992 Summer Olympics
Place of birth missing (living people)